Umm Salal Sport Club is a Qatari professional football club based in Umm Salal, that competes in the Qatar Stars League, the highest tier of Qatari football. It used to be known as Al-Tadamun Sport Club. It is best known for being the first Qatari club to make it to the semi-finals of the AFC Champions League.

History
Umm Salal were formed in 1979 under the name Al-Tadamun Club and entered into the Qatari Second Division along with five other clubs. After the dissolution of two other clubs in the second division, Al Tadamun was also dissolved. The club was reformed in 1996, with Sheikh Abdulaziz bin Abdulrahman Al Thani heading the club. It won the Qatari 2nd Division in their second season after reformation, in addition to lifting the league trophy two more times in 2000 and 2006.

In 2004, the club's name, Al Tadamun Club, was changed to "Umm Salal" by decision of the Qatar Olympic Committee.

They won promotion to the Qatar Stars League in the 2006–07 season. They enjoyed league success, finishing third in consecutive seasons. In 2008, they qualified for the AFC Champions League 2009 after defeating Al Gharafa 4–1 on penalties in the Emir Cup final. They were knocked out of the ACL in the semi-finals, which was the furthest any Qatari club had ever advanced at that time.

The team's nickname, Barzan's Falcons, is a reference to the Barzan Tower, which the Umm Salal Mohammed Fort houses. The tower became renowned for being used during Ramadan to ensure the holy month was observed at the correct time.

Honours
Emir of Qatar Cup
Winners (1): 2008

Sheikh Jassem Cup
Winners (1): 2009

Qatari 2nd Division
Winners (3): 1998, 2000, 2006

Statistics

League seasons
{|class="wikitable collapsible"
|-bgcolor="#efefef"
! Season
! Div.
! Pos.
!Emir of Qatar Cup
!Crown Prince Cup
!Sheikh Jassim Cup
!colspan=2|Asia
|-
| style="text-align: center;" | 2007
| style="text-align: center;" | QSL
| style="text-align: center;" | 3
| style="text-align: center;" | Quarter-final
| style="text-align: center;" | Semi-final
| style="text-align: center;" | Group stage
| style="text-align: center;" |  –
| style="text-align: center;" |  –
|-
| style="text-align: center;" | 2008
| style="text-align: center;" | QSL
| style="text-align: center;" | 3
| style="text-align: center;" bgcolor=gold | Winners
| style="text-align: center;" | Semi-final
| style="text-align: center;" | Group stage
| style="text-align: center;" |  –
| style="text-align: center;" |  –
|-
| style="text-align: center;" | 2009
| style="text-align: center;" | QSL
| style="text-align: center;" | 6
| style="text-align: center;" | 2nd round
| style="text-align: center;" | Group stage
| style="text-align: center;" bgcolor=gold | Winners
| style="text-align: center;" | CL
| style="text-align: center;" | Semi-final
|-
| style="text-align: center;" | 2010
| style="text-align: center;" | QSL
| style="text-align: center;" | 7
| style="text-align: center;" bgcolor=silver|Runners-up
| style="text-align: center;" | Group stage
| style="text-align: center;" | Group stage
| style="text-align: center;" |  –
| style="text-align: center;" |  –
|-
| style="text-align: center;" | 2011
| style="text-align: center;" | QSL
| style="text-align: center;" | 9
| style="text-align: center;" | 3rd round
| style="text-align: center;" | Group stage
| style="text-align: center;" bgcolor=silver |Runners-up
| style="text-align: center;" | –
| style="text-align: center;" | –
|-
|}

Asian record

Q = Qualification
GS = Group stage
R16 = Round of 16
QF = Quarter-final
SF = Semi-final

AFC Champions League

Colours and crest

Crest history

Shirt sponsors and manufacturers

Kit history

Stadium
Built in 1996 in Umm Salal Ali, the Umm Salal Stadium covers 34,500 m² and features two football pitches, locker rooms and an administrative office. However, due to its insufficient capacity and facilities, the club uses Thani bin Jassim Stadium as its homegrounds.

Players

List of notable players

Only league games are counted. To appear in this list, a player must have either:
Made at least 50 appearances for the team
Scored at least 15 goals for the team
Updated 14 August 2013.

Board of directors

Coaching staff

Managerial history
As of June 2021.

 Saad Hafez (1999–01)
 Said Razgui (2001–02)
 Lakhdar Belloumi (2003)
 Fareed Ramzy (2004)
 Robert Mullier (2004–05)
 Abdelhak Benchikha (2005–06)
 Hassan Hormutallah (Feb 20, 2007–July 1, 2007)
 Richard Tardy (July 1, 2007–Oct 26, 2007)
 Hameed Bremel (2007)
 Laurent Banide (Nov 7, 2007–Nov 3, 2008)
 Gérard Gili (Nov 16, 2008–April 12, 2010)
 Henk ten Cate (April 12, 2010–Feb 6, 2011)
 Hassan Hormutallah (Feb 7, 2011–Nov 15, 2011)
 Gérard Gili (Dec 15, 2011–June 30, 2012)
 Bertrand Marchand (July 1, 2012–March 1, 2013)
 Alain Perrin (March 9, 2013–Sept 30, 2013)
 Gérard Gili (Sept 30, 2013–Dec 12, 2013)
 Bülent Uygun (Dec 12, 2013–Dec 14, 2016)
 Talal El Karkouri (Jan 5, 2017–Dec 12, 2018)
 Mahmoud Gaber (Dec 16, 2016–June 30, 2018)
 France Laurent Banide (Jul 1, 2018–Nov 14, 2018)
 Raúl Caneda (Jan 1, 2019–Oct 25, 2019)
 Ahmed El Abyad (Oct 30, 2019-Nov 3, 2019)
 Aziz Ben Askar (Nov 4, 2019- present)

References

 
Football clubs in Qatar
Association football clubs established in 1979
1979 establishments in Qatar
Sport in Umm Salal